MSI may refer to:

Organizations
 Marketing Science Institute, a nonprofit learning institution in Cambridge, Massachusetts, US
 Media Sport Investment, the international fund of investors that ran Sport Club Corinthians Paulista
 Millennium Science Initiative, an international program bringing technology to developing nations
 Ministry of Science and Innovation (New Zealand)
 Minority-serving institution, in US higher education
 MSI Reproductive Choices, an international non-governmental organisation providing contraception and safe abortion services, with a global HQ in London, UK
 Museum of Science and Industry (Chicago)
 Science and Industry Museum, in Manchester, England
 University of Minnesota Supercomputing Institute
 Italian Social Movement (Movimento Sociale Italiano), a defunct post-fascist party

Companies
 Micro-Star International, a Taiwanese information technology company
 Midwest Scientific Instruments, a defunct American computer company
 Morgan Stanley (Broker ID), an American financial services company
 Motorola Solutions (NYSE: MSI), an American data communications and telecommunications equipment provider
 Movie Star (company) (AMEX: MSI), an American clothing manufacturer

Science and technology
 MSI Barcode, a continuous numeric barcode symbology
 Microsatellite instability, an abnormality of DNA
 Mass spectrometry imaging, a technique used in mass spectrometry
 Mass sociogenic illness, the rapid spread of physical symptoms of illness among the members of a group with no physical or infectious cause
 Magnetic source imaging, magnetoencephalography combined with magnetic resonance imaging
 Multispectral imaging, the capture of multiple, specific wavelengths in the electromagnetic spectrum
Musculoskeletal injury, damage of muscular or skeletal systems which is usually due to a strenuous activity

Computing
 .MSI, the filename extension of Windows Installer packages
 Medium Scale Integration, a generation of integrated circuit chips which contain hundreds of transistors
 Message Signaled Interrupts, a PCI 2.2 interrupt-mechanism
 MSI protocol, a basic cache-coherence protocol used in multiprocessor systems

Other uses
 Mindless Self Indulgence, an American band
 Maison du Sport International, an office complex in Lausanne, Switzerland
 Multistakeholder initiative, a governance structure
 Mid-Season Invitational, an annual League of Legends tournament
 Maritime safety information